Vicentico 5 (2012) is the fifth album by Argentine rock and pop singer-songwriter Vicentico.

Reception
The AllMusic review by Mariano Prunes awarded the album 4 stars, stating: "Overall in 5, Vicentico continues to do as he pleases at the risk of confusing his fan base – his latter-day mainstream Latin-American audience will not find much to dance to in this album, and the rock/ska/punk crowd to which he originally belonged is not going to welcome the prodigal son with open arms if he insists on covering acts such as ABBA, Roberto Carlos, and Xuxa all in the same album – but hey, so far it has worked wonders for his solo career, both in commercial and artistic terms".

Track listing 
All tracks by Vicentico & Cachorro Lopez except where noted.

 "Creo Que Me Enamoré" (I think I Fell in Love) – 3:12
 "No Te Apartes De Mí" (Don`t Fall Apart from me) (Roberto Carlos, Erasmo Carlos) – 3:19
 "Un Diamante" (A Diamond) (Vicentico) – 3:38
 "Soldado De Dios" (Soldier of God) – 2:51
 "Nada Va A Cambiar" (Nothing is Going to Change) – 3:31
 "La Tormenta" (The Storm) – 3:29
 "Esto De Quererte" (This Loving you Thing) (Capello, Lopez) (Graciela Carballo, Max di Carlo, Christian De Walden) – 3:45
 "Sólo Hay Un Ganador" (There`s Only one Winner) (Benny Andersson, Björn Ulvaeus) – 3:32
 "Fuego" (Fire) – 3:38
 "Fuera Del Mundo" (Outside the World) (Sebastián Schon, Vicentico) – 3:37
 "Carta A Un Joven Poeta" (Letter to a Young Poet) – 3:17

Personnel 
 Dany Avila – drums
 Cachorro López – arrangements, Synth bass
 Richard Nant – flugelhorn
 Vicentico – arrangements, backing vocals, main vocals, synth
 German Widemer – keyboard
 Demian Nava Zambrini – synth

Technical personnel 
 Luis Gómez Escolar – adaptation
 Cristian Minuta – wardrobe
 Vaino Rigozzi – personal manager
 Sebastián Schon – arrangement
 Cesar Sogbe – mixing
 Rafa Vila – A&R

References

External links 
 www.vicentico.com
 Vicentico 5 at MusicBrainz
 [ Vicentico 5] at AllMusic

Vicentico albums
2012 albums